Sebastian Mallaby's The World's Banker: A Story of Failed States, Financial Crises, and the Wealth and Poverty of Nations (2004) (The World's Banker) is a financial biography book. British journalist Mallaby is a highly ranked member of the Council on Foreign Relations, working in international economics.

Summary
Mallaby follows a formula in his books, using each chapter to focus on a different geographic concern related to the world bank during the tenure of J.D. Wolfensohn.

Preface: The Prisoner of Lilliput
Chapter One: A Tale of Two Ambitions - concerns the outlook of U.S. president after the attacks.
Chapter Two: “World Bank Murderer”
Chapter Three:The Renaissance President
Chapter Four: A Twister in Africa
Chapter Five: Mission Sarajevo
Chapter Six:  Narcissus and the Octopus
Chapter Seven: The Cancer of Corruption
Chapter Eight: Uganda's Myth and Miracle
Chapter Nine: A Framework for Development
Chapter Ten: From Seattle to Tibet
Chapter Eleven: Waking Up to Terror
Chapter Twelve: A Plague upon Development
Chapter Thirteen: Back to the Future
Chapter Fourteen: A Lion at Carnegie
Afterword: regarding the appointment of successor Paul Wolfowitz

Reception
"Mallaby gives us a sophisticated, evenhanded take on the bank's last decade of development efforts."

"Mallaby, a Washington Post editorial writer, provides a sympathetic yet critical assessment of the World Bank under Wolfensohn's leadership, crediting him for bringing the bank much closer to its developing-country clients but faulting him for trying to take on too wide a scope of activity without a clear and manageable set of priorities."

Editions
The World's Banker: A Story of Failed States, Financial Crises, and the Wealth and Poverty of Nations. Penguin Press, October, 2004. Hardcover USA.   1st ed. pages: 432.
The World's Banker: A Story of Failed States, Financial Crises, and the Wealth and Poverty of Nations. Penguin Press, October 2004. Paperback.   1st ed. pages: 432.
The World's Banker: A Story of Failed States, Financial Crises, and the Wealth and Poverty of Nations. Penguin Press, April 25, 2006. Hardcover USA.  2nd ed.  pages: 496.
This edition features a new afterword by the author that analyzes the appointment of Paul Wolfowitz as Wolfensohn's successor at the World bank.

Kindle other electronic book editions.
Audiobook edition by Audible Audio.

See also
"James David Wolfensohn". World Bank. Archived from the original on 12 November 2020. Retrieved 26 November
 World Bank biography; retrieved 7 May 2008

References

External links
After Words interview with Mallaby on More Money Than God, August 28, 2010

2010 non-fiction books
Finance books
Business books
Penguin Press books